Charles Goodrich (born November 9, 1969) is an American politician and businessman serving as a member of the Indiana House of Representatives from the 29th district. He assumed office on November 7, 2018.

Early life and education 
Goodrich was born in Roann, Indiana in 1969. He earned an Associate of Science degree in architectural design from Vincennes University, a Bachelor of Science in building construction management from Purdue University.

Career 
Goodrich is the CEO of Gaylor Electric, an electrical contracting company. He is a member of the Associated Builders and Contractors Executive Committee and is a board member of the Riverview Health Foundation and Purdue Construction Advisory Council for Building Construction Management. He was elected to the Indiana House of Representatives in November 2018.

References 

1969 births
Living people
People from Noblesville, Indiana
Republican Party members of the Indiana House of Representatives
People from Wabash County, Indiana
Businesspeople from Indiana
Vincennes University alumni
Purdue University alumni